Mario Tomas Talavera Rodríguez (born 18 October 1972) is a retired Spanish Paralympic judoka. He won a silver medal at the 1992 Summer Paralympics.

References

1972 births
Living people
Sportspeople from the Province of Las Palmas
Spanish male judoka
Paralympic judoka of Spain
Judoka at the 1992 Summer Paralympics
Judoka at the 1996 Summer Paralympics
Medalists at the 1992 Summer Paralympics
20th-century Spanish people
21st-century Spanish people